Cunningham Lake (In Carrier:  Yeko Bun) is situated approximately 91 kilometres from Fort St. James, British Columbia via Lind Pit Lake road. Nankut Creek connects Cunningham to Stuart Lake.

It is also the name of a tranquil little village nearby, used as a summer–fall camp for thousands of years by the Yekoochet'en people and other nearby Indigenous people. In fact, the Yekooche people's very name derives from the area – Ye Koo refers to Yeko Bun (Cunningham Lake) and Che describes the tail end of Nankut Creek.  Cunningham Lake Indian Reserve No. 11 is located on the south shore of the lake (officially to the Tl'azt'en Nation known as Ye Koos Lee Indian Reserve 11).

As well as a source of hay for cows and horses, the area provides Lake trout, whitefish, kokanee, moose, bear, deer, duck, and beaver to hunters. Such food is dried or canned for winter, or historically, traded in Fort St. James for staples such as sugar, flour and rice.

There is a small island called Ruby Rock where the Joseph brothers have a Hunting/Fishing Guide Outfitting company. There is also a little peninsula, known as Yekoosle, where there are cabins owned by a family from Yekooche First Nation. There are also small cabins belonging to the Joseph brothers on the small reservation nearby which they use for haying and hunting. At night, guests can hear loons calling in the distance, and wolves and coyotes howling.

References

Lakes of British Columbia
Dakelh
Omineca Country
Range 5 Coast Land District